The Muskwa Formation is a stratigraphical unit of Frasnian age in the Western Canadian Sedimentary Basin. 

It takes the name from Muskwa River, and was first described in the Western National Gas Fort Nelson a-95-J/94-J-10 well by F.F. Gray and J.R. Kassube, in 1963.

Lithology
The Muskwa Formation is composed of bituminous shale. Pyrite is a common accessory mineral.

Gas production

Gas is produced from the Muskwa Formation shales in the Horn River Basin in the Greater Sierra oil field in north-eastern British Columbia. Horizontal drilling and fracturing techniques are used to extract the gas from the low permeability shales (see Shale gas).

Distribution

Relationship to other units
The Muskwa Formation is a sub-unit of the Horn River Formation; it is conformably overlain by the Fort Simpson Formation and conformably underlain by the Otter Park Member.

See also
Muskwa Ranges

References

Geologic formations of Alberta
Shale formations
Oil-bearing shales in Canada
Natural gas fields in Canada
Western Canadian Sedimentary Basin
Devonian System of North America
Upper Devonian Series
Devonian Alberta
Devonian British Columbia
Devonian Northwest Territories
Peace River Country
Frasnian Stage